Evoxymetopon is a genus of cutlassfish found in all oceans. It is one of nine genera in the family Trichiuridae.

Species
There are currently four recognized species in this genus:
 Evoxymetopon macrophthalmus Chakraborty, Yoshino & Iwatsuki, 2006 (Bigeye scabbardfish)  
 Evoxymetopon moricheni Fricke, Golani & Appelbaum-Golani, 2014 
 Evoxymetopon poeyi Günther, 1887 (Poey's scabbardfish)
 Evoxymetopon taeniatus T. N. Gill, 1863 (Channel scabbardfish)

References

Trichiuridae
Marine fish genera
Taxa named by Theodore Gill